The Keeper or Master of the Rolls and Records of the Chancery of England, known as the Master of the Rolls, is the President of the Civil Division of the Court of Appeal of England and Wales and Head of Civil Justice. As a judge, the Master of the Rolls is second in seniority in England and Wales only to the Lord Chief Justice. The position dates from at least 1286, although it is believed that the office probably existed earlier than that.

The Master of the Rolls was initially a clerk responsible for keeping the "Rolls" or records of the Court of Chancery, and was known as the Keeper of the Rolls of Chancery. The Keeper was the most senior of the dozen Chancery clerks, and as such occasionally acted as keeper of the Great Seal of the Realm. The post evolved into a judicial one as the Court of Chancery did; the first reference to judicial duties dates from 1520. With the Judicature Act 1873, which merged the Court of Chancery with the other major courts, the Master of the Rolls joined the Chancery Division of the High Court and the Court of Appeal, but left the Chancery Division by the terms of the Judicature Act 1881. The Master of the Rolls had also been warden of the little-used Domus Conversorum for housing Jewish converts, which led to the house and chapel being used to store legal documents and later becoming the location of the Public Record Office. He retained his clerical functions as the nominal head of the Public Record Office until the Public Records Act 1958 transferred responsibility for it to the Lord Chancellor. One residual reminder of this role is the fact that the Master of the Rolls of the day continues to serve, ex officio, as President of the British Records Association. The Master of the Rolls was also previously responsible for registering solicitors, the officers of the Senior Courts.

One of the most prominent people to hold the position was Thomas Cromwell, a highly influential figure during the reign of Henry VIII; more recently, Lord Denning held the position for 20 years, from 1962 to 1982, and made sweeping changes in the common law. On 3 October 2016, Sir Terence Etherton succeeded Lord Dyson as Master of the Rolls. In July 2020, it was announced that Sir Geoffrey Vos was to be appointed as his replacement from 11 January 2021.

List of Masters of the Rolls

Gallery

Peerages created for the Master of the Rolls

See also 
:Category:Masters of the Rolls

References

Bibliography 

Ceremonial officers in the United Kingdom
Judges of the Court of Appeal (England and Wales)
Courts of England and Wales
English civil law
 
Lists of judges in the United Kingdom